The Argument is a 2016 play by the Scottish writer William Boyd. Its premiere production, directed by Anna Ledwich, ran at the Hampstead Theatre Downstairs in London from 3 March to 2 April 2016.

The playscript was published by Bloomsbury Publishing under its  Methuen Drama imprint in March 2016.

References

External links
 Publisher's official website
 Drama Online page on The Argument

2016 plays
Plays by William Boyd (writer)